Bolga is an island in the municipality of Meløy in Nordland county, Norway. The  island has a population (2017) of 105. It is located west of the islands of Meløya and Åmøya, just off the coast of the Helgeland region. Most of the population of the island lives along the eastern shore in the village that is also known as Bolga. It is the only village on the island. There are regular ferry connections from Bolga to the islands of Meløya to the east and to Vassdalsvik and Ørnes on the mainland.

See also
List of islands of Norway

References

Islands of Nordland
Villages in Nordland
Populated places of Arctic Norway
Meløy